Walter Duddesden (fl. 1407), of Wells, Somerset, was an English politician.

He was a Member (MP) of the Parliament of England for Wells in 1407.

References

14th-century births
15th-century deaths
English MPs 1407
People from Wells, Somerset